The WBCA NCAA Division I Defensive Player of the Year is awarded by the Women's Basketball Coaches Association to the best defensive player in NCAA Division I women's basketball. The winner is selected from among the winners of the defensive player of the year award for each individual conference. If any individual conference does not have such an award, the conference can nominate a player to be considered for the countrywide award. The award has been given annually since 2007 and is chosen by a WBCA selection committee.

Winners

See also

 List of sports awards honoring women

References 

Awards established in 2007
College basketball trophies and awards in the United States
Sports awards honoring women